The Victoria Cross (VC) is the highest award of the United Kingdom honours system. It is awarded for gallantry "in the face of the enemy" to members of the British armed forces. It may be awarded posthumously. It was previously awarded to Commonwealth countries, most of which have established their own honours systems and no longer recommend British honours. It may be awarded to a person of any military rank in any service and to civilians under military command although no civilian has received the award since 1879. Since the first awards were presented by Queen Victoria in 1857, two-thirds of all awards have been personally presented by the British monarch. These investitures are usually held at Buckingham Palace.

The first citations of the VC, particularly those in the initial gazette of 24 February 1857, varied in the details of each action; some specify date ranges while some specify a single date. The original Royal Warrant did not contain a specific clause regarding posthumous awards, although official policy was not to award the VC posthumously. Between 1897 and 1901, several notices were issued in the London Gazette regarding soldiers who would have been awarded the VC had they survived. In a partial reversal of policy in 1902, six of the soldiers mentioned were granted the VC, but not "officially" awarded the medal. In 1907, the posthumous policy was completely reversed and medals were sent to the next of kin of the six soldiers. The Victoria Cross warrant was not officially amended to explicitly allow posthumous awards until 1920, but one quarter of all awards for the First World War were posthumous. Three people have been awarded the VC and Bar, which is a medal for two actions; Noel Chavasse, Arthur Martin-Leake and Charles Upham. Chavasse received both medals for actions in the First World War, while Martin-Leake was awarded his first VC for actions in the Second Boer War, and his second for actions during the First World War. Charles Upham received both VCs for actions during the Second World War.

The Victoria Cross has been awarded 1,358 times to 1,355 individual recipients. The largest number of recipients for one campaign is the First World War, for which 628 medals were awarded to 627 recipients. The largest number awarded for actions on a single day was 24 on 16 November 1857, at the Second Relief of Lucknow, during the Indian Mutiny. The largest number awarded for a single action was 18, for the assault on Sikandar Bagh, during the Second Relief of Lucknow. The largest number awarded to one unit during a single action was seven, to the 2nd/24th Foot, for the defence of Rorke's Drift (22–23 January 1879), during the Zulu War. Since 1991, Australia, Canada and New Zealand have created their own separate Victoria Crosses: the Victoria Cross for Australia, the Victoria Cross for Canada, and the Victoria Cross for New Zealand. Five of these separate medals have been awarded, all for actions in the War in Afghanistan; Willie Apiata received the Victoria Cross for New Zealand on 26 July 2007; Mark Donaldson received the Victoria Cross for Australia on 16 January 2009; and Ben Roberts-Smith was awarded the Victoria Cross for Australia on 23 January 2011. Corporal Daniel Keighran VC and Corporal Cameron Stewart Baird VC MG have also been awarded the medal for their actions in Afghanistan. As these are separate medals, they are not included in this list.

The youngest recipient of the VC was Andrew Fitzgibbon who was fifteen at the time of the action that earned him the VC. The oldest recipient was William Raynor at 61 at the time of his action in 1857. There have been several VCs awarded to close relatives. Four pairs of brothers and three fathers and sons have been awarded the VC. In his book Victoria Cross Heroes, Lord Ashcroft notes the story of the Gough family as possibly the "bravest family." Major Charles Gough was awarded the VC in 1857 for saving his brother, Lieutenant Hugh Gough who then went on to win a VC himself in the same year, after he charged enemy guns. Charles' son, John Gough, then went on to win the family's third VC in 1903.Andrew Joseph-SAS 2001 (Not released to public,)
Mark Rodger-SAS 2001(Not released to public,)

Recipients (A–F)
By default this list sorts alphabetically. Indian and Nepalese convention is for the family name first and the given name second; this is reflected in this list. The rank column sorts by the rank of the recipient at the time of the action. This column sorts by the comparative rank of the recipient within the British Armed Forces command structure. Within the British Armed Forces the Navy is the Senior Service, followed by the Army and then the Royal Air Force (RAF).

Notes
A Recipient awarded the Victoria Cross for multiple acts of valour or for an extended period of sustained courage and outstanding leadership, rather than a single act of valour.
B Chavasse died of his wounds two days after the deed which merited his second Victoria Cross.
C Died of his wounds.

References
General

Specific

External links

 A-F